Alanthus is a ghost town in Gove County, Kansas, United States.

History
Alanthus was issued a post office in 1887. The post office was discontinued in 1917.

References

Further reading

External links
 Gove County maps: Current, Historic, KDOT

Former populated places in Gove County, Kansas
Former populated places in Kansas